Qualification for swimming at the 2020 Summer Paralympics begin on 1 October 2018 and finish on 31 January 2020. There are 340 male and 280 female athlete quotas in 146 swimming events (76 male, 67 female, 3 mixed relays).

Timeline
Athletes have to compete in at least one of the following competitions in order to be qualified for the Summer Paralympics.

Quotas
The qualification slots are allocated to the NPC not to the individual athlete. In Bipartite Commission Invitation method, the slot is allocated to the individual athlete not to the NPC. World Para Swimming (WPS) reserves the right to allocate slots to the use of certain sports classes particularly for swimmers with complex needs; the slot shall be used as allocated or the NPC must return the slot to WPS.
 An NPC can allocate a maximum of 34 male and 28 female qualification slots in a maximum of 62 qualification slots. Exceptions may be granted through the Bipartite Invitation Commission method.
 An NPC can enter a maximum of three eligible swimmers per medal event.
 NPCs can enter an athlete who has met at least one MQS (Minimum Qualification Standard) time in any medal event and have met the MET (Minimum Entry Time) to any medal event.
 An NPC can only enter one relay event team as long as they meet the MQS for any of the events. All team members have to be qualified in at least one individual event to be selected in the relay team.

Allocated time targets

Quotas achieved
Two top medalists in all swimming medal events at the 2019 World Para Swimming Championships will earn a qualification slot for their representing country. As of 15 September 2019.
Athletes who has achieved an MQS performance at any World Para Swimming recognised competition between 1 October 2018 and 31 January 2020 but didn't achieve a direct allocation at the World Championships will be given an allocation slot for their NPC.

See also
Swimming at the 2020 Summer Olympics – Qualification

References

Swimming at the Summer Paralympics
2020 in swimming